The Nakajima Ki-34 was a Japanese light transport of World War II. It was a twin-engine, low-wing monoplane; the undercarriage was of tailwheel type with retractable main units. During the Pacific War, the Allies assigned the type the reporting name Thora.

Design and development
The Ki-34 was originally designed as a civil transport. Nakajima Aircraft Company, which had the license-production rights to the Douglas DC-2, began design work in 1935 on a smaller twin engine airliner for routes which did not have the capacity to justify use of the larger DC-2. The initial design was designated AT-1, and after numerous design iterations, flew as a prototype designated AT-2 on 12 September 1936. The design was all metal, except for the flight control surfaces, which were plywood. The wings used a multi-cell cantilever design. The prototype was fitted with  Nakajima Kotobuki 2-1 radial engines with fixed pitch wooden propellers, which were replaced in production models with Kotobuki-41  nine-cylinder radial engines, with variable pitch metal propellers.

Operational history

Civil use (AT-2)
A total of 32 AT-2s were produced for Imperial Japanese Airways (Dai Nippon Koku KK) and Manchukuo National Airways, operating on scheduled routes between Tokyo and Hsinking, Tokyo and Tianjin, and within Manchukuo. These aircraft remained in operational service until the surrender of Japan in August 1945.

Military history (Ki-34 and L1N1)
[[File:Airborne Scene - Kato hayabusa sento-tai 1944 (04) wmplayer 2013-07-17.jpg|thumb| Airborne Scene from "Kato hayabusa sento-tai (Colonel Kato's Falcon Squadron).]]
With a high demand for increased military transport capability after the start of the Second Sino-Japanese War in 1937, the Imperial Japanese Army adapted the AT-2 design for military use by fitting with more powerful Nakajima Ha-1b radial engines and re-designating the aircraft as the Army Type 97 Transport and Ki-34. The initial 19 aircraft were produced by Nakajima Aircraft, and another 299 aircraft were subsequently produced by the Army-affiliated Tachikawa Hikoki K.K. The final airframe was delivered in 1942.

In operational service, the Ki-34 was used as a utility aircraft for liaison and communications duties, and for paratrooper training and Special Forces operations.

At a later date, some aircraft were transferred to the Imperial Japanese Navy, where they were known as the Navy Type AT-2 Transport or Nakajima L1N1. Several were also transferred to the air force of the Japanese puppet state of China-Nanjing in 1942.

Operators

Military operators
 China-Nanjing
Nanjing Air Force

 Imperial Japanese Army Air Force
 Imperial Japanese Navy Air Service

Civil operators

 Imperial Japanese Airways (Dai Nippon Koku KK'')

 Manchukuo National Airways

Mongolian People's Army Aviation operated more than 12 captured aircraft since in late September 1945.

Specifications (Ki-34)

Notes

Bibliography
  (new edition 1987 by Putnam Aeronautical Books, .)

External links

 Warbirds Resource Group

Ki-34, Nakajima
Ki-34, Nakajima
Ki-034
Low-wing aircraft
Aircraft first flown in 1936
Twin piston-engined tractor aircraft